Phyllomya is a genus of flies in the family Tachinidae.

Species
Phyllomya albipila Shima & Chao, 1992
Phyllomya angusta Shima & Chao, 1992
Phyllomya annularis (Villeneuve, 1937)
Phyllomya aristalis (Mesnil & Shima, 1978)
Phyllomya elegans Villeneuve, 1937
Phyllomya formosana Shima, 1988
Phyllomya fuscicosta Curran, 1927
Phyllomya gibsonomyioides Crosskey, 1976
Phyllomya gymnops (Villeneuve, 1937)
Phyllomya humilis Shima, 1988
Phyllomya japonica Shima, 1988
Phyllomya limata (Coquillett, 1902)
Phyllomya nigripalpis Liang & Zhang, 2018
Phyllomya nobilis Mesnil, 1957
Phyllomya palpalis Shima & Chao, 1992
Phyllomya pictipennis (Wulp, 1891)
Phyllomya polita (Coquillett, 1898)
Phyllomya procera (Meigen, 1824)
Phyllomya pubiseta (Mesnil, 1953)
Phyllomya rufiventris Shima & Chao, 1992
Phyllomya sauteri (Townsend, 1927)
Phyllomya takanoi Mesnil, 1970
Phyllomya volvulus (Fabricius, 1794)
Phyllomya washingtoniana (Bigot, 1889)

References

Dexiinae
Diptera of Asia
Diptera of Europe
Tachinidae genera
Taxa named by Jean-Baptiste Robineau-Desvoidy